Below is a list of the Regions of Trinidad and Tobago ranked by their Human Development Index as of 2021.

References

Human Development Index
Regions
Trinidad and Tobago